Srđan Ristić (born 10 August 1992) is a Serbian footballer.

Club career
Born in Gnjilane, Ristić started his senior career with Napredak Kruševac, where he stayed until 2013. After he appeared with Bežanija and Prva Petoletka as a loaned player during the 2012–13 season, Ristić permanently moved to Radnik Surdulica. Playing with the club, he noted 28 caps with 3 goals in the Serbian First League between 2013 and 2014. Ristić was also with Dinamo Vranje in early 2015. Shortly after he joined the Serbian SuperLiga side Jagodina in summer 2015, Ristić moved on one-year loan deal to the satellite club Tabane Trgovački, where he scored 8 goals on 25 matches in the Serbian League East for the 2015–16 season. Signing a one-year professional contract with Jagodina in summer 2016, Ristić started new season with the club, but he needed to break his career due to injury he earned in the second fixture match of the 2016–17 Serbian First League against Kolubara, after which he lost one kidney.

Career statistics

Club

Honours
Radnik Surdulica
Serbian First League: 2014–15

References

External links
 
 

1992 births
Living people
People from Gjilan
Association football forwards
Serbian footballers
FK Napredak Kruševac players
FK Bežanija players
FK Radnik Surdulica players
FK Dinamo Vranje players
FK Jagodina players
Serbian First League players